The New Bridge (also known as Mitrovica Bridge, Ibar River Bridge or  with the unofficial Austerlitz Bridge) is a steel truss bridge crossing the Ibar river in Mitrovica, a city in Serbian enclave of northern Kosovo. The New Bridge has become an iconic symbol of Kosovo division, as it separates around 80,000 Kosovo Albanians in the south from around 50 000 Serbs and other nationalities living in the north.  It was used as a military checkpoint and provides a de facto border and buffer zone between the northern Serbian enclaves and the rest of Kosovo. Today the bridge is open to pedestrians and there are only Carabinieri patrols from KFOR-MSU and Kosovo Police, but there is no longer any checkpoint. However, the bridge is more than symbolic to Serbia. It is important part for Serbian people who recognize this north part of Kosovo as their own.

History 

In 2001 the bridge was refurbished with French government money. Structural operations such as the widening of the central pier, the reconstruction of the slab and pavements made of concrete and the replacement of the bearings and expansion joints were performed on the  bridge construction. Apart from these bridge repair actions the works also included the placement
of additional architectural elements such as viewpoints on the bridge, the supply and placement of lighting, bank access steps and the construction of two decorative arches. The Freyssinet company was awarded the contract to reconstruct the Mitrovica Bridge. The contract's terms stipulated that Freyssinet hire a multi-ethnic construction team to rebuild the bridge. In September 2000 the 61 workers from Kosovo were chosen - equal parts Albanians and Serbians. The project manager was Pierre Lottici. The Department of Transport and Infrastructure - a division of the UNMIK Joint Interim Administrative Structure (JIAS) - oversaw the bridge contract. At the end of June 2001, the new DM3 million Mitrovica Bridge was handed over to the City of Mitrovica.

The New Bridge is one of three bridges over the Ibar within Mitrovica.  The other two, one leading to the railway station, and the other being an abandoned railway bridge, are only lightly used. The New Bridge is the main crossing point between the two sides of the city for pedestrians.

People from Mitrovica and even soldiers from KFOR often refer to the bridge calling it "Austerlitz Bridge", due to the close resemblance  to the French Pont d'Austerlitz.

Since 2012 the northern and the southern edges of the bridge are patrolled 24/7 by Italian Carabinieri from KFOR-MSU to maintain peace and stability in the area and to deter illegal activities.

See also
 District of Mitrovica
 Monuments in Mitrovica

Notes

References

External links

Border crossings of divided cities
Bridges in Kosovo
Checkpoints
Kosovo–Serbia border
North Kosovo
Mitrovica, Kosovo
Bridges completed in 2001
2001 establishments in Kosovo
Cultural heritage monuments in Mitrovica, Kosovo